Ann Marcus (August 22, 1921 – December 3, 2014) was an Emmy Award-winning American television writer and film producer.

She graduated from Western College for Women, worked for the New York Daily News and Life, where she worked with famed photographers such as Alfred Eisenstadt. In 2007, she was executive producer of the independent feature film, For Heaven's Sake.

Television writing credits
Lassie
The Hathaways
Please Don't Eat the Daisies
The Debbie Reynolds Show
Gentle Ben
Peyton Place
General Hospital 
Love Is a Many Splendored Thing
Search for Tomorrow
Mary Hartman, Mary Hartman
Fernwood 2-Nite
All That Glitters
Julie Farr, M.D.
Days of Our Lives
Love of Life
Falcon Crest
Knots Landing
Knots Landing: Back to the Cul-de-Sac
Flamingo Road
L.A.T.E.R: The Life And Times of Eddie Roberts

Other
Marcus was elected to the board of directors of the WGAe seven times and served as Secretary/treasurer from 1992 to 1994. She published her memoir, Whistling Girl in 1999.

Family
She and her husband, Ellis Marcus, also a television writer, had three children.

Death
On December 3, 2014, Ann Marcus died in Sherman Oaks, California at the age of 93, from bladder cancer.

Awards and nominations
Nominated for multiple Daytime Emmys and Primetime Emmys. Her first Daytime Emmy nomination was in 1978 for Outstanding Writing for a Drama Series. Marcus was also presented with the Morgan Cox Award for distinguished service to the WGA in 2000.

Head Writing Tenure

|-

|-

|-

|-

References

Sources

The Caucus, 
PRNewsWire
 New York Times obituary

External links 
 
 

1921 births
2014 deaths
American soap opera writers
Miami University alumni
Western College for Women alumni
People from Greater Los Angeles
People from Little Falls, New York
Deaths from cancer in California
Screenwriters from New York (state)
Deaths from bladder cancer
Screenwriters from California
20th-century American screenwriters
20th-century American women writers
21st-century American women